Francis Charles "Oxie" Lane (January 2, 1905 – August 19, 1977) was a player in the National Football League for the Milwaukee Badgers in 1926 as a tackle. He played at the collegiate level at Marquette University.

Biography
Lane was born on January 2, 1905, in Merrill, Wisconsin.

References

External links

1905 births
1977 deaths
People from Merrill, Wisconsin
Players of American football from Wisconsin
Milwaukee Badgers players